Mahbub Alam Chashi (1927–1983)  was a public official and social worker from Bangladesh. He pioneered the Swanirvar Movement, a 'basic need' centred approach to rural upliftment and community development, which attempted to include various groups within the village structure in Bangladesh. Chashi also promoted the Rangunia model cooperatives in 1960s. The Government of Bangladesh recognized his contributions to the national life by awarding him the Independence Day Award the highest civilian award of the country, in 1977 by military dictator Ziaur Rahman regime. He played a crucial role as mastermind to kill Sheikh Mujibur Rahman along with all of his family members expect two daughters who stayed abroad then, in the 15 August 1975 coup.

Career 
Alam served in the Embassy of Pakistan to the United States in the early 1960s.

Alam resigned from Pakistan Foreign Service service in 1967. He added the prefix Chashi, meaning farmer, to him name and developed a model agriculture farming project in Rangunia outside of Chittagong.

During Bangladesh Liberation war he served as secretary to Khandakar Mushtaq Ahmed and worked with Taheruddin Thakur. After the Independence of Bangladesh, he was appointed the Vice-Chairperson of Bangladesh Academy for Rural Development.

After the assassination of Sheikh Mujibur Rahman, Alam and Taheruddin Thakur accompanied Khandakar Mushtaq Ahmed to the radio station where Mustaq announced Mujib's death and declared himself the new president of Bangladesh.

References

Bangladeshi social workers
1927 births
1950 deaths
Recipients of the Independence Day Award
Assassination of Sheikh Mujibur Rahman